WPAT (930 AM), is a radio station licensed to Paterson, New Jersey, with a brokered programming format. WPAT is owned by Multicultural Broadcasting, and its studios are located in New York City, in Manhattan's Financial District. The station's four  transmitting towers are located in Clifton, New Jersey.

History
WPAT first went on the air in 1941, from studios at 7 Ellison Street in Paterson. In December 1949, it began broadcasting 24 hours a day with power increased to 5,000 watts using a directional antenna. Air personalities then included John Henry Faulk.

For many years, the station (along with its FM counterpart) would broadcast a beautiful music format under the slogan "Easy 93". WPAT was the essence of a mellow sound and feel; the requirement for different programming between the AM and FM was met simply by repeating the previous week's AM programs in a slightly different order on FM. Initially, the music was only instrumental versions of pop standards by artists like Mantovani, Henry Mancini, Stan Kenton, Jackie Gleason, Hollyridge Strings, Ray Conniff, Percy Faith, David Rose and Ferrante & Teicher, among others. Some of the music bordered on light classical. The FM station was added in 1958.

The WPAT stations were purchased by Capital Cities Communications in 1961.  In the late 1960s the stations added several vocalists per hour. The vocalists were pop standards artists like Lettermen, Frank Sinatra, Tony Bennett, Patti Page, and others. Vocals were only very soft ones that had string arrangements and the stations steered clear of jazzy type vocals at that point. Throughout the 1960s, WPAT also resisted playing easy instrumental versions of baby boomer pop and rock and roll songs, however after WCBS-FM adopted a beautiful music format called the "Young Sound" which played a mix of easy listening instrumental versions of rock songs and some soft rock, WPAT began at least playing such songs in instrumental easy arrangements. In the 1970s, WPAT began integrating some baby boomer soft vocals such as The Carpenters, Neil Diamond, Dionne Warwick, and others, still playing one vocal per 15 minutes. In 1982, the stations began playing soft rock songs mixed into the format a couple of times an hour and cut back on pop standards artists and songs.

In 1985, Capital Cities announced that it would buy ABC. As a result of Federal Communications Commission regulations at the time, the company decided to sell WPAT and WPAT-FM because ABC already owned WABC and WPLJ in New York City. The WPAT stations would be sold to Park Communications. By the early 1990s both frequencies of WPAT evolved to an adult contemporary format.

In January 1996, WPAT-FM was sold to Spanish Broadcasting System and switched to a Spanish-language adult contemporary format. Around the same time, WPAT was sold to Heftel Broadcasting and switched to an automated classic salsa–tropical music format on March 26. Heftel tried buying the FM station but was narrowly outbid by SBS. Heftel bought WPAT with plans to sell it to Multicultural Broadcasting and buying an FM station. Their plans were to not change formats to Spanish music for the long term but to broker the station for their eventual sale. Weeks later, the station would start adding ethnic and paid programming. The station continued running overflow sports events from WFAN in English as well as English-language public affairs programming. In January 1997, the station began brokering 18 hours a day to Radio Korea. The station kept Spanish programming a few hours a day, in addition to the English-language sports and public affairs programs. This was done with intent of selling the station.

By the next year, the station's ownership would change finally when its current owners, Multicultural Broadcasting, would buy the station in exchange for WNWK plus Multicultural was paid some cash for WNWK as well. (WNWK subsequently would become WCAA, then in 2009 would switch frequencies with WQXR-FM, New York.  It is now known as WXNY-FM and broadcasts at 96.3 FM.)  The new owners of WPAT would soon modify the station to its current paid ethnic programming format, moving Radio Korea to WZRC. Currently WPAT is the station that broadcasts Colombia's syndicated radio show La W every morning, Monday through Friday, which features personality Julio Sánchez Cristo.

See also
List of radio stations in New Jersey

References

External links
FCC History Cards for WPAT
 

 Jim Hawkin's WPAT Transmitter Site page
 WPAT tribute

PAT
Radio stations established in 1941
Multicultural Broadcasting stations
1941 establishments in New Jersey
Brokered programming